The Oxonian in Town is a 1767 play by George Colman the Elder. It premiered on 7 November 1767 and was later published in 1769. A satire, the work depicts a naive student of Oxford University travelling south to London where he becomes mixed up with shady company, only to be rescued by a fellow undergraduate from Oxford.

References

Bibliography
 Kinservik, Matthew J. Disciplining Satire: The Censorship of Satiric Comedy on the Eighteenth-Century London Stage. Associated University Presses, 2002.
 Wormersley, David. Gibbon and the 'Watchmen of the Holy City': The Historian and his Reputation, 1776–1815. Oxford University Press, 2002.

Plays by George Colman the Elder
1767 plays